Andrew (or Andreotto) (died 3 April 1308) was the Judge of Arborea from 1304.

He was the elder of two illegitimate sons of John and Vera Cappai. He co-ruled with his brother Marianus III, but he had the supremacy and the title autocrator basileus. From their mother, the Bas-Serra family which ruled in Arborea became known as the Cappai de Bas.

In 1308, Andrew acquired the castles of Serravalle di Bosa, Planargia, and Costaville from the Malaspina. These acquisitions were retained as the private holdings of the family (peculio), but were the proceeds from them were used to finance the administration of the demesne (fisc).

1308 deaths
Judges (judikes) of Arborea
Year of birth unknown